is a female Japanese voice actress specializing in voicing characters in adult video games.

Voice roles

OVA
G-Taste
Imōto Jiro
Magical Canan

Games
A Profile
After... - Kanami Shiomiya 
Ane, Chanto Shiyō Yō
Ane to Boin
Baldr Force EXE
Blue
Edelweiss - Sakura Takase 
Figyu @ Mate
Galzoo Island
Koihime Musō - Rinrin, Kayū
Légion d'honneur
Magical Canan
Maple Colors
Meguri, Hitohira
Miageta Sora ni Ochite Iku
Miko Miko Nurse
One: Kagayaku Kisetsu e - Mayu Shiina
Rui wa Tomo o Yobu
Sensei da - Isuki
Shamana Shamana: Tsuki to Kokoro to Taiyō no Mahō
Sharin no Kuni, Himawari no Shōjo - Sachi Mitsuhiro
Shin Koihime Musō - Rinrin, Kayū
Sharin no Kuni, Yūkyū no Shōnenshōjo
Sora no Iro, Mizu no Iro - Asa Mizushima
Soul Link
Tamamura
Xross Scramble

Anime
Koihime Musō - Rinrin, Kayū
Shin Koihime Musō - Rinrin, Kayū
Shin Koihime Musō: Otome Tairan - Rinrin, Kayū.

External links
Miya Serizono's personal website 

Japanese voice actresses
Living people
Place of birth missing (living people)
Year of birth missing (living people)